Kaew the Playful is a children's literature by Waen Kaew (Princess Maha Chakri Sirindhorn's pen name), the first published in 1978. The novel is adapted from the author's own experience, it's the story of primary school girl Kaew and her friends.

Chapters

Translation 
In 1982, Guo Xuanying was ready to begin translating the royal work of Princess Sirindhorn of Thailand, and invited Chen Bochui, a writer of children's literature, to make a preface to "The Brilliant and Wonderful Scroll" (闪光美妙的画卷), at the same time, Princess Sirindhorn herself also wrote the Chinese preface in the Chinese translation of the work. In August 1983, the Chinese translation of the work was called "", published by Juvenile and Children's Publishing House in Shanghai (少年儿童出版社), belong to the "Foreign Children's Literature Series" (外国儿童文学丛书). 5000 copies of the first edition were printed and the remaining 50 copies were handed over to Princess Sirindhorn.

References 

1978 children's books
Thai short stories